The 13th National Hockey League All-Star Game took place at the Montreal Forum on October 3, 1959, which saw the hometown Montreal Canadiens defeat the NHL all-stars 6–1.

Contracts and eligibility 
A few of the game's top stars were absent from the game, due to a new NHL ruling that players be signed under contract in order to play in the all-star game. The intention of this clause was to intimidate players who were holding out from their team, a tactic that worked for Dickie Moore, Frank Mahovlich and George Armstrong, yet failed for others, resulting in All-Star coach Punch Imlach being unable to choose six of the best players (Tim Horton, Dick Duff, Bobby Hull, Tod Sloan, Pierre Pilote and Bob Pulford). Combined with six Montreal Canadiens being named to the First and Second team All-Stars, this meant that coach Imlach had to fill the voids with inferior players.

The subsequent snubbing of these players also went into the pre-game festivities, as they were also denied the multitude of gifts that traditionally was given to players in the game - including those already with their names engraved on it.

It was Maurice Richard's 13th consecutive appearance, making him the only player to that date who had appeared in all of the all-star games. He would retire after winning the Stanley Cup later that season. Montreal goaltender Jacques Plante appeared in the game without a mask, despite his intention of wearing one throughout the season.

Game summary

 Referee: Frank Udvari
 Linesmen: George Hayes, Bob Frampton
 Attendance: 13,818

See also
1959–60 NHL season

References
 

National Hockey League All-Star Games
All-Star Game
1959
Ice hockey competitions in Montreal
October 1959 sports events in Canada
1950s in Montreal
1959 in Quebec